1993 UCI Track Cycling World Championships – Men's individual pursuit was part of the 1993 UCI Track Cycling World Championships.

In 1993 the amateur 4 km and professional 5 km pursuit events were combined in a single championship run over 4 km. The format was different also, with the top 4 from the qualifying round going directly to the semi-finals, and the two winners of those races meeting in the final for silver and gold.

Qualifying

        1. Philippe Ermenault, France,          4:23.283 world record  
        2. Graeme Obree, Britain,               4:24.321
        3. Chris Boardman, Britain,             4:24.719
        4. Shaun Wallace, Britain,              4:26.832
        5. Jens Lehmann, Germany,               4:27.518
        6. Roman Saprykin, Russia,              4:29.306
        7. Torsten Schmidt, Germany,            4:29.785
        8. Andreas Bach, Germany,               4:29.892
        9. Steve Hegg, U.S.,                    4:32.170
        10. Vadim Kravchenko, Kazakhstan,       4:32.215
        11. Eddy Seigneur, France,              4:33.953
        12. Jan-Bo Petersen, Denmark,           4:33.991
        13. Michael Sandsted, Denmark,          4:34.362
        14. Jesper Nielsen, Denmark,            4:34.461
        15. Steffen Kjaergaard, Norway,         4:34.462
        16. Francis Moreau, France,             4:34.927
        17. Serguei Matveev, Ukraine,           4:35.831
        18. Glenn McLeay, New Zealand,          4:36.101
        19. Friedrich Berein, Austria,          4:36.310
        20. Gunter De Winne, Belgium,           4:36.712
        21. Bruno Risi, Switzerland,            4:37.403
        22. Brian Walton, Canada,               4:38.244
        23. Ryszard Dawidowicz, Poland,         4:38.284
        24. Robert Karsnicki, Poland,           4:38.375
        25. Bogdan Bondarev, Ukraine,           4:38.698
        26. Fabio Placanica, Argentina,         4:39.358
        27. Jonathan Garrido, Spain,            4:39.531
        28. Noriyuki Iijima, Japan,             4:39.724
        29. Richard Rozendaal, Netherlands,         4:40.304
        30. George Portelanos, Greece,          4:40.350
        31. Alexander Smirnov, Belarus,         4:40.472
        32. Glen Thomson, New Zealand,          4:41.957
        33. Edgardo Simón, Argentina,           4:42.150
        34. Yasuhiro Ando, Japan,               4:42.460
        35. Jukka Heinikanen, Finland,          4:42.803
        36. Carlos Suarez, Colombia,            4:42.974
        37. Gianni Patuelli, Italy,             4:44.461
        38. Viktor Kunz, Switzerland,           4:44.898
        39. Marcel Dunkel, Switzerland,         4:46.125
        40. Alberny Vargas, Colombia,           4:48.153
        41. Ho-Sung Cho, Korea,                 4:48.480
        42. Stefano Casagranda, Italy,          4:48.572
        43. Esteban Lopez, Colombia,            4:48.773
        44. Patrick van Dijken, Netherlands,        4:48.880
        45. Jose Jarque, Spain,                 4:49.450
        46. Wayne Burgess, South Africa,        4:49.560
        47. Christian Selin, Finland,           4:50.548
        48. Henning Orre, Norway,               4:53.246
        49. Sergey Lavrinenko, Kazakhstan,      4:53.784

Semi-finals
Ermenault beat Wallace
Obree beat Boardman

Final
Obree beat Ermenault

References

UCI Track Cycling World Championships – Men's individual pursuit